2009 Kyoto Sanga F.C. season

Competitions

Player statistics

Other pages
 J. League official site

Kyoto Sanga F.C.
Kyoto Sanga FC seasons